Ramsvik Church is a parish church of the Church of Norway in Indre Fosen municipality in Trøndelag county, Norway.  It is located at Ramsvik, on the south side of the village of Råkvåg, on the shore of the Stjørnfjorden. It is one of the churches for the Sør-Stjørna parish which is part of the Fosen prosti (deanery) in the Diocese of Nidaros. The white, wooden church was built in a long church style in 1908 by an unknown architect. The church seats about 200 people.

History
The building was originally constructed as a chapel in 1908 and it was consecrated in August 1909. Over the years it has been expanded several times and now it has been upgraded to a full parish church.

See also
List of churches in Nidaros

References

Indre Fosen
Churches in Trøndelag
Long churches in Norway
Wooden churches in Norway
20th-century Church of Norway church buildings
Churches completed in 1908
1908 establishments in Norway